Flint Hall may refer to:

Flint Hall (Gainesville, Florida), historic building on the University of Florida campus, listed on the National Register of Historic Places (NRHP)
Heritage Hall (Valparaiso University), Indiana, originally known as Flint Hall
Flint Hall, Syracuse, New York, historic building on the campus of Syracuse University

See also
The Flint Estate, Antrim, New Hampshire, NRHP-listed in Hillsborough County
Flint Farm, Andover, Massachusetts, NRHP-listed  
Flint House (Massachusetts), Lincoln, Massachusetts, NRHP-listed